IP EXPO is a B2B information technology event series which has been running since 2005 and is held annually in London, Manchester, and Stockholm. It is organised by Imago Tech media which is part of Clarion Events Ltd.

As well as technology vendors, the event also offers attendees the opportunity to watch noteworthy speakers. In past years these have included world-famous hacker Kevin Mitnick (2013), inventor of the World Wide Web Tim Berners-Lee (2014), Wikipedia founder Jimmy Wales (2015), Oxford University Professor and author Nick Bostrom (2016), World-renowned scientist Brian Cox (physicist) (2017) and Canadian astronaut Chris Hadfield (2018).

The IP EXPO event series is predominantly free to attend for visitors, provided they register beforehand, but since 2018 a paid option has been available to access conference level content around IoT, AI and Blockchain.

Trade fairs in the United Kingdom
Computer-related trade shows